Khungkhani is a village development committee in Baglung District in the Dhaulagiri Zone of central Nepal. At the time of the 1991 Nepal census it had a population of 1,908 and had 397 houses in the village. Chhantyal, Dalits and Magar are the three ethnic groups living in the VDC.

References

Populated places in Baglung District